The Eyes of Love or A Scarlet Angel (Swedish: Kärlekens ögon) is a 1922 Swedish silent drama film directed by John W. Brunius and starring Gösta Ekman, Pauline Brunius and Vilhelm Bryde. It was shot at the Råsunda Studios in Stockholm.

Cast
 Gösta Ekman as 	Henry Warden
 Pauline Brunius as Louise Kent
 Karen Winther as 	Elsie Campbell
 Vilhelm Bryde as 	Charles Zukor
 Jenny Tschernichin-Larsson as 	Henry's Mother
 Carl Browallius as 	Henry's Father
 Justus Hagman as 	Elise's Father
 Nils Lundell as 	Waiter

References

Bibliography
 Hjort, Mette & Lindqvist, Ursula. A Companion to Nordic Cinema. John Wiley & Sons, 2016.
 Sadoul, Georges. Dictionary of Film Makers. University of California Press, 1972.

External links

1922 films
1922 drama films
Swedish drama films
Swedish silent feature films
Swedish black-and-white films
Films directed by John W. Brunius
1920s Swedish-language films
Silent drama films
1920s Swedish films